Hodkinson is a surname. Notable people with the surname include:

 Joseph Hodkinson (1889–1954), English footballer
Paul Hodkinson, British boxer
William Wadsworth Hodkinson, founder and president of Paramount pictures
Trent Hodkinson, Australian rugby league player

See also
The Hodkinson abbreviated mental test score, used to assess for dementia or confusion
Hodgkinson